Richard Harris Barham (6 December 1788 – 17 June 1845) was an English cleric of the Church of England, a novelist and a humorous poet. He was known generally by his pseudonym Thomas Ingoldsby and as the author of The Ingoldsby Legends.

Life
Richard Harris Barham was born in Canterbury. When he was seven years old his father died, leaving him a small estate, part of which was the manor of Tappington, in Denton, Kent, mentioned frequently in his later work The Ingoldsby Legends. At nine he was sent to St Paul's School, but his studies were interrupted by an accident that partly crippled his arm for life. Deprived of vigorous bodily activity, he became a great reader and diligent student.

During 1807 he entered Brasenose College, Oxford, intending at first to study for the law, but deciding on a clerical career instead. In 1813 he was ordained and found a country curacy. He married the next year and in 1821 he gained a minor canonry at London's St. Paul's Cathedral, where he served as a cardinal. Three years later he became one of the priests in ordinary of the King's Chapel Royal.
 
In 1826 Barham first contributed to Blackwood's Magazine. In 1837 he began to contribute to the recently founded Bentley's Miscellany a series of tales (mostly metrical, some in prose) known as The Ingoldsby Legends. These became popular and were published in collected form in three volumes between 1840 and 1847, and have since appeared in numerous editions. They may perhaps be compared to Hudibras. The stories are generally whimsical, but based on antiquarian learning. There is also a collection of Barham's miscellaneous poems, edited posthumously by his son, called The Ingoldsby Lyrics.

Barham was a political Tory, yet a lifelong friend of the liberal Sydney Smith and of Theodore Hook. Barham, a contributor to the Edinburgh Review, the Literary Gazette and John Gorton's Biographical Dictionary, also wrote a novel, My Cousin Nicholas (1834). He died in London on 17 June 1845, after a long and painful illness.

Legacy
Barham is a character in George MacDonald Fraser's historical novel Flashman's Lady, he meets the main character, Harry Flashman, while watching a public execution.

His last poem As I laye a-thynkynge, was set to music by the English composer Edward Elgar, the song published in 1888. And in 1918 the composer Cyril Rootham set the same poem, for voice and piano.

There is a Wetherspoons pub in Burgate, Canterbury, near the cathedral, named The Thomas Ingoldsby.

There is a memorial to him at St Paul's Cathedral.

Notes

References

Further reading

External links

 
 
 

1788 births
1845 deaths
Writers from London
19th-century pseudonymous writers
Alumni of Brasenose College, Oxford
People educated at St Paul's School, London
19th-century English Anglican priests
Burials at Kensal Green Cemetery
People from Canterbury
People from Dover District